The Slovak League was the ice hockey league in the Slovak Republic from 1938–1944.

Champions
1938–39 – VŠ Bratislava
1939–40 – VŠ Bratislava
1940–41 – ŠK Bratislava
1941–42 – ŠK Bratislava
1942–43 – OAP Bratislava
1943–44 – OAP Bratislava

Results

1938–39
Final:
VŠ Bratislava – ŠK Banská Bystrica 1–0

1939–40

1940–41

1941–42

1942–43

1943–44

References 

Defunct ice hockey leagues in Europe
Sports leagues established in 1938
1938 establishments in Czechoslovakia
1944 disestablishments in Czechoslovakia
Ice hockey leagues in Slovakia
Sports leagues disestablished in 1944